Vengeance Is Mine, All Others Pay Cash is the third novel by Eka Kurniawan which was originally published in Indonesian by Gramedia Pustaka Utama in 2014 as Seperti Dendam, Rindu Harus Dibayar Tuntas.

Following international recognition that came with the strong reception to the English version of Kurniawan's earlier works—Beauty Is a Wound and Man Tiger—Vengeance Is Mine, All Others Pay Cash was announced in July 2017 with translation by Annie Tucker. As of December 2017, the novel has been translated into English, French, German, Mandarin, and Arabic.

Synopsis 
Ajo Kawir is one of the toughest fighters in the Javanese underworld, his fearlessness matched only by his unquenchable thirst for brawling. But the young thug is driven by a painful secret: he is impotent. When he finally meets his match in the shape of the fearsome, beautiful bodyguard Iteung, Ajo is left bruised, battered, and overjoyed. He has fallen in love. But will he ever be able to make Iteung happy if he can’t get it up?

Main characters 

 Ajo Kawir, a fearless thug who suffers from impotency.
 Iteung, a tough bodyguard with whom Ajo Kawir falls in love.
 Tokek (Gecko in the English version), Ajo Kawir's best friend.

Reception 
In a review for The Atlantic, Jane Yong Kim called the novel "a surreal, poignant account of a teen attempting to become a man." Comparing it to Kurniawan's previous work Man Tiger, Kim wrote "In Man Tiger, Kurniawan masterfully played with time to tell a complicated family story from multiple sides. The point of that novel, as with Vengeance, is to show the insidious, trickle-down effects of men who wreak havoc with little consideration for those around them. Both works illustrate these knots of community, where propriety and rage and survival coexist, with a surprising amount of compassion—and illuminate the pain and learning of the next generation with tremendous grace."

Writing for Asian Review of Books, Tim Hannigan called Kurniawan "the Quentin Tarantino of Indonesian literature" for his "gleeful references to pulp fiction, lashings of stylized violence, and an array of characters and scenarios that far surpass the tropes and clichés which inspire them."

Accolades

Film adaptation 

A film adaptation directed by Edwin was announced in 2016 with Kurniawan co-writing the screenplay with Edwin. Marthino Lio was cast as Ajo Kawir while Singer-songwriter Sal Priadi makes his film debut as Tokek. Citra Award-nominated actress Ladya Cheryl plays Iteung.

References 

2014 novels
Indonesian novels adapted into films
Novels set in Indonesia